Takanobu Nishikawa (born January 14, 1992) is a Japanese professional basketball player who last played for the Saga Ballooners of the B.League in Japan. He played college basketball for Meiji University. He represented his country for the 2018 William Jones Cup.

External links

References

1992 births
Living people
Japanese men's basketball players
Ibaraki Robots players
Levanga Hokkaido players
Saga Ballooners players
San-en NeoPhoenix players
SeaHorses Mikawa players
Sportspeople from Hokkaido
Forwards (basketball)